"Wavy" is a song by American singer Ty Dolla Sign included as a bonus track on his debut studio album, Free TC  (2015). It features the American rapper Joe Moses. The track was released on January 16, 2016, as the fourth and final single from the album.

Commercial performance
Despite peaking on the US Bubbling Under R&B/Hip-Hop Singles chart, the single is Ty's third most popular song as lead artist on streaming services with over 240 million streams on Spotify as of 2023. It spent 16 consecutive weeks on Billboard (with no official radio release) starting in April 2016. It has also since been certified Platinum by the RIAA.

Usage in the media
"Wavy" has been highly popular with Hip-hop dance. The "1 Million Dance Studio" recorded its own choreography performance to the track. The video has over three million views on YouTube.

Charts

Weekly charts

Certifications

Release history

References

External links

2016 singles
2016 songs
Ty Dolla Sign songs
Atlantic Records singles
Song recordings produced by Mustard (record producer)
Songs written by Mustard (record producer)
Songs written by Ty Dolla Sign